Jill Loraine Zimmerman (born 23 March 1959) is an American computer scientist and the James M. Beall Professor of Mathematics and Computer Science at Goucher College. Since 2006, she has been the head of the Goucher Robotics Lab.

Early life and education 
Zimmerman is from Naperville, Illinois. While in high school in 1975, Zimmerman and her father built a computer with four kilobytes of memory after being inspired by the January cover story of Popular Mechanics by Ed Roberts on building your own computers. Zimmerman later remarked that it was this same article that inspired Bill Gates.

In 1981, Zimmerman earned a Bachelor of Science with distinction in Computer and Informational Sciences with a minor in Mathematics from Purdue University. At graduation, she ranked among the top ten students in the School of Science and was a member of Phi Beta Kappa and Phi Kappa Phi. Upon enrolling in doctoral studies at the University of Minnesota Institute of Technology, Zimmerman was named a Corporate Associate Fellow. In 1990, she earned a doctorate in computer science, specializing in computational and recursion theory. Zimmerman completed her dissertation titled Classes of Grzegorczyk-Computable Real Numbers under her doctoral advisor Marian Pour-El.

Career 
Zimmerman joined the faculty at Goucher College in 1990 as a visiting professor. She was the principal investigator for the "Computer Science, Mathematics, and Engineering Scholarship Program" where she received $220,000 from the National Science Foundation to be conducted between January 2002 – December 2005. Zimmerman has run the Goucher Robotics Lab since 2006. She is the James M. Beall Professor of Mathematics and Computer Science at Goucher College.

Personal life 
In 1985, Zimmerman married computer science professor James Gil de Lamadrid.

Selected works

References

External links 
 
 

1959 births
Living people
Place of birth missing (living people)
University of Minnesota alumni
Goucher College faculty and staff
Purdue University alumni
American women computer scientists
American computer scientists
21st-century American women scientists
20th-century American women scientists
People from Naperville, Illinois
American women academics